HMS Guadeloupe (or Guadaloupe), was a 28-gun sixth-rate  frigate of the Royal Navy. The ship was designed by Sir Thomas Slade, and was initially contracted to be built with the Pembrokeshire shipwright John Williams of Neyland; however he became bankrupt and the Admiralty transferred the order to the Plymouth Naval Dockyard.

Guadeloupe served during the American War of Independence. In May 1778 she was under the command of Captain Hugh Robinson.
At Yorktown her men, stores, and guns were landed to support the British Army during the siege. When she came under fire from shore batteries the British scuttled her in the York River, Virginia, on 10 October 1781 to prevent the French capturing her.

The French Navy subsequently salvaged her and then commissioned her in April 1783 after they had repaired her. She arrived at Brest. She was ordered on 8 July 1786 at Rochefort to be deactivated and delisted.

Citations

References

External links

Ships built in Plymouth, Devon
1763 ships
Sixth-rate frigates of the Royal Navy
Frigates of the French Navy
Captured ships
Maritime incidents in 1781
Scuttled vessels of the United Kingdom